Enolmis delnoydella is a moth of the family Scythrididae. It was described by Groenen and Schreurs in 2016. It is found in Spain (Almeria).

The wingspan is 12–13 mm. The forewings are white, with dark grey markings, the basal fascia hardly reaching the dorsum and the subbasal fascia angled, interrupted at the middle. The median fascia is broad and incised at the middle and there is a single black dot between the median and the terminal fascia. This terminal fascia runs along the termen and is sinuate. The hindwings are grey.

Etymology
The species is named for the collector of the species, Mr. Jos Delnoye.

References

Scythrididae
Moths described in 2016
Moths of Europe